USCGC Winona (WHEC-65) was an Owasco class high endurance cutter built for World War II service with the United States Coast Guard. The war ended before the ship was completed and consequently she did not see wartime service until the Vietnam War.

Winona was built by Western Pipe & Steel at the company's San Pedro shipyard. Named after Winona Lake, Indiana, she was commissioned as a patrol gunboat with ID number WPG-65 on 19 April 1946. Her ID was later changed to WHEC-65 (HEC for "High Endurance Cutter" - the "W" signifies a Coast Guard vessel)

Peacetime service
From 15 August 1946 to 11 September 1947, Winona was stationed at San Pedro, California, and used for law enforcement, ocean station, and search and rescue operations. She was subsequently homeported at Port Angeles, Washington until 31 May 1974.

On 17 November 1948, she towed the disabled MV Herald of Morning. On 10 June 1949, she assisted FV Alice B 2 miles off South Amphitrite Point. On 13 February 1950, she towed the disabled MV Edgecombe to Seattle, Washington. On 16 June 1951, she escorted FV Sea Lark to Ketchikan, Alaska. On 18 and 19 March 1952, she assisted the disabled MV Darton until relieved by a commercial tug. From 23 to 25 December 1952, she assisted MV Maple Cove at 48°22’N, 134°26’W. On 13 February 1954, she assisted FV Western Fisherman. On 20 December 1954, she medevaced a crewman from MV General Pope. She patrolled the Gold Cup Races at Seattle, Washington, on 7 August 1955. Winona served on Bering Sea patrol from July to September 1956. She was back performing that same task from 20 July to 21 September 1963.

Vietnam War
Winona was assigned to Coast Guard Squadron Three, South Vietnam, from 25 January to 17 October 1968. On 1 March the Winona sank a North Vietnamese trawler designated T-A.

Return to peacetime duties
On 31 January 1969, Winona stood by MV Belmona following a fire 15 miles southwest of Cape Flattery until commercial tugs arrived. On 20 July 1969, she assisted in the operations following the sinking of a barge loaded with diesel fuel near Admiralty Inlet. On 28 October 1970, she provided medical assistance to Urea Maru 300 miles off San Francisco.

Decommissioning

The ship was decommissioned on 31 May 1974 and was laid-up at the US Coast Guard Base, Alameda, California until she was scrapped in late 1976.

Footnotes

References

See also
 Action of 1 March 1968

Owasco-class cutters
Ships of the United States Coast Guard
Vietnam War patrol vessels of the United States
Ships built in Los Angeles
1945 ships